Jana Šustková (born 10 January 1998) is a Czech handball player for DHK Baník Most and the Czech national team.

She participated at the 2018 European Women's Handball Championship.

References

External links

1998 births
Living people
People from Kyjov
Czech female handball players
Sportspeople from the South Moravian Region